The Nela is a river in northeastern Castile-Leon, Spain, one of the tributaries of the Ebro River.

The river has its source in the karstic hills of Montes del Somo, near Merindad de Valdeporres. Most of the Nela's water is drawn by the Trasvase Cerneja-Ordunte to supply water to Bilbao, as well as irrigation.
There are fishfarms in Busnela and Pedrosa de Valdeporres, as well as a hydroelectric complex in Nofuentes. Finally the Nela flows into the Ebro near Trespaderne.

The amphibian Discoglossus galganoi, the fish Chondrostoma toxostoma and the snail Elona quimperiana are among the most common animal species found in the Nela river's waters.

References

External links
 
 Junta de Castilla y León, Servicio de Espacios Naturales
 Environment - Nature & Biodiversity, Página de la Comisión Europea sobre conservación de la naturaleza y biodiversidad
 Environment - LIFE,Instrumento de financiación para el medio ambiente de la Unión Europea.

Rivers of Spain
Province of Burgos
Rivers of Burgos
Rivers of Castile and León

es:Gállego